Roland Juhász (born 1 July 1983) is a Hungarian former professional footballer who played as a centre-back.

Career

MTK Budapest
Juhász spent his youth career in Tápiószecső playing for the local club Tápiószecső FC. He started his professional career at the MTK Budapest FC in 1999. Playing 107 Hungarian League matches and scoring 12 goals convinced the Hungary national football team coach to list him in the squad. Juhasz became Hungarian League champion in the 2002–03 season with MTK Budapest. At the end of the 2004–05 season of the Hungarian League, the Belgian club RSC Anderlecht signed him.

Anderlecht
Juhász signed with Anderlecht on 29 August 2005. He made his debut for the club against Chelsea in the UEFA Champions League. On 19 September 2005, he fractured a bone in his foot which meant that Anderlecht were deprived of the services of the Hungarian defender for several weeks.

Juhász became Belgian Pro League champion four times with the club in the 2005–06, 2006–07, 2009–10, 2011–12 seasons. In 2009, he was voted as the Best Defender of the Belgian First Division and Player of the Year for 2009 by the Hungarian Football Federation.

In 2011 Juhász was voted as the Best Hungarian Football Player of the Year for 2011.

On 8 August 2011, it was announced that Ally McCoist's Rangers F.C. could not agree with Anderlecht on a transfer fee for Juhász. Anderlecht rejected the £3 million-plus offer from Rangers despite the sum matching a release fee Juhász thought had been agreed with his employers 12 months previously. Juhász's agent suggested this could ruin the player's career.

On 18 November 2011, Celtic F.C. was linked with a £2.6 million deal for Juhász, with Celtic manager Neil Lennon stating that Juhász fit the bill. However, Juhász instead extended his contract with Anderlecht until 2014.

Videoton (on loan)
On 19 February 2013, the agreement with the Hungarian League club Videoton FC was announced on Anderlecht's website, although it was not confirmed by the Hungarian club until 20 February 2013. Roland Juhász joined the champions of the 2010–11 season on a loan deal until the end of the 2012–13 season.

International career
Juhasz's debut came on 25 April 2004 in a friendly with Japan, which he marked with a goal.
On 7 September, Hungary started the FIFA world cup 2014 qualifying with a 5–0 win in Andorra, Juhász scored the first goal. On 31 May 2016, Juhász was selected for the Hungarian squad at the Euro 2016 tournament in France.

On 18 June 2016, Juhász played in a 1–1 draw against Iceland at the Stade Vélodrome, Marseille. He also played in the last group match in a 3–3 draw against Portugal at the Parc Olympique Lyonnais, Lyon on 22 June 2016. Juhász announced his retirement from the national team on 5 July 2016.

Philanthropy
In 2011 Juhász along with Szabolcs Huszti financially supported the Hungarian Gyermekkor Alapítvány (Youth Foundation) in order to supply Hungarian hospitals for children with essential and adequate devices.

Career statistics

Club

International

Scores and results list Hungary's goal tally first, score column indicates score after each Juhász goal.

Honours
MTK Budapest
Hungarian League: 2002–03; runner-up 1999–2000
Hungarian Cup: 1999–2000
Hungarian Super Cup: 2003

Anderlecht
Belgian Pro League: 2005–06, 2006–07, 2009–10, 2011–12; runner-up 2007–08, 2008–09
 Belgian Cup: 2007–08
 Belgian Supercup: 2006, 2007, 2010, 2012
 Trofeo Santiago Bernabéu: runner-up 2006

Videoton
 Nemzeti Bajnokság I: 2014–15, 2017–18

Individual
 Young Hungarian Player of the Year: 2005
 Hungarian Football Federation nominated him to be the best domestic footballer of the year: 2008, 2009
 Hungarian Footballer of the Year: 2009
 Best defender in the Belgian First Division: 2009

References

External links
Roland Juhász fan site (In English)

1983 births
Living people
People from Cegléd
Hungarian footballers
Association football central defenders
Hungary international footballers
UEFA Euro 2016 players
MTK Budapest FC players
R.S.C. Anderlecht players
Fehérvár FC players
Belgian Pro League players
Nemzeti Bajnokság I players
Hungarian expatriate footballers
Hungarian expatriate sportspeople in Belgium
Expatriate footballers in Belgium
Sportspeople from Pest County